Conference of the Norwegian-Danish Evangelical Lutheran Church of America usually called the Conference was a Lutheran church body that existed in the United States from 1870 to 1890, when it merged into the United Norwegian Lutheran Church of America.

The church had split from the Scandinavian Evangelical Lutheran Augustana Synod in North America (SAS) in 1870. Prior to the split the SAS had placed a Norwegian seminary in Marshall, Wisconsin, which today is located in Minneapolis, Minnesota, and known as Augsburg University.

When the Conference separated from the SAS in 1870, another church body also split from the SAS, the Norwegian-Danish Augustana Synod in America (NAS). The difference between the NAS and the Conference was the inclusion of the Book of Concord. The NAS wanted to include the entire Book of Concord as the confessional base. The Conference wanted to use only the three ecumenical creeds, Luther's Small Catechism, and the Unaltered Augsburg Confession.

The two groups along with the Anti-Missourian Brotherhood group from the Norwegian Synod united in 1890 to form the United Norwegian Lutheran Church of America.

In 1884, a group of Danish members left the Conference and formed the Danish Evangelical Lutheran Church Association in America also known as the Danish Association and "the Blair Church".

Presidents of the Conference
1870-1872  Claus Lauritz Clausen
1872-1881  Johan Olsen
1881-1886  Theodor H. Dahl
1886-1890  Gjermund Hoyme

References
Fevold, Eugene L.  The Lutheran Free Church: A Fellowship of American Lutheran Congregations 1897-1963 (Minneapolis: Augsburg Publishing House, 1969)
Nelson, E. Clifford, and Fevold, Eugene L. The Lutheran Church among Norwegian-Americans: a history of the Evangelical Lutheran Church (Minneapolis: Augsburg Publishing House, 1960)

Lutheran denominations in North America
Danish-American history
Evangelical Lutheran Church in America predecessor churches
History of Christianity in the United States
Religious organizations established in 1870
Lutheran denominations established in the 19th century
Norwegian-American history